Illusion is an independent feature film released in 2004. It was directed by Michael Goorjian and features Kirk Douglas in his last film role before his retirement in 2008 and eventual death in 2020.

Plot
Legendary film director Donald Baines lies dying alone in his private screening room, watching the films he has devoted his life to creating. Having isolated himself from family and friends, he now regrets many personal sacrifices. The rejection of his illegitimate child, Christopher, brings him the most pain, since Donald saw him only once, 30 years ago.

Late one night, Donald is awakened by the ghostly image of Stan, a favorite editor who has been dead more than 35 years. Suddenly Donald finds his deathbed transported to an old movie house. Stan informs Donald that he has come to help and that he will show him three films - three visions - each vision representing a different period of Christopher's life.

The first vision brings Donald into the teenage life of Christopher who is in the throes of his first brush with love. A rebel and a romantic, Christopher proclaims his love for a girl he has only seen from afar and chances it all for an opportunity to spend some time with her. A nagging voice, which sounds like the father he never knew, echoes in his head, telling him he is not worthy.

A wild romp marks the second vision of the twenty-something life of Christopher as he tries to escape an artistic maelstrom and finds himself face to face with the love he had for a brief moment and lost from the first vision. His life takes a brutal twist as he finds but again loses his love.

The last vision Donald sees is the return of Christopher now as a mature man, wearied from the difficult curveballs life has thrown him. Again looking for love, this is his last and perhaps only chance to rid himself of what he imagines to be his father's haunting disapproval.

Cast
Kirk Douglas as Donald Baines
Michael Goorjian as Christopher 
Karen Tucker as Isabelle
Bryan Cranston as David
Richmond Arquette as Mortimer
Ron Marasco as Stan
Ted Raimi as Ian
Kristen Clement as Sara
Kevin Weisman as Kay
Ronald Víctor García as Andrew
Michael Kemmerling as Seymour
Jules Bruff as Renee
Nancy Jeffries as Anastasia
Steve Chabon as Bishop
Gibson Frazier as Interviewer

External links
http://www.imdb.com/title/tt0290218/

2004 films
American independent films
American romantic drama films
2000s English-language films
2000s American films